Minnesota State Highway 86 (MN 86) is a highway in southwest Minnesota, which runs from Iowa Highway 86 at the Iowa state line, near Spirit Lake, IA, and continues north to its northern terminus at its intersection with State Highway 60 near Windom and Wilder.

Route description

The route has an interchange with Interstate 90 near Lakefield.

Kilen Woods State Park, on the banks of the Des Moines River, is 5 miles east of the junction of Highway 86 and County Road 24.  The park entrance is located on County Road 24.

History
Highway 86 was authorized in 1933.

In 1934, the highway was paved between U.S. Highway 16 and Lakefield.

The route was still gravel south of U.S. 16 in 1942.  It was completely paved by 1953.

Major intersections

References

086
Transportation in Jackson County, Minnesota